Shut Down The Streets is the third solo album by A.C. Newman, released on October 9, 2012 on Matador Records.

Recording and release

Newman cited the Gerry Rafferty song "Baker Street" as inspiration for the album.

Reception

The album was named a longlisted nominee for the 2013 Polaris Music Prize on June 13, 2013. The album is a shortlisted nominee for the Juno Award for Adult Alternative Album of the Year at the Juno Awards of 2014.

Track listing
 "I'm Not Talking" – 4:48
 "Do Your Own Time" – 4:33
 "You Could Get Lost Out Here" – 4:04
 "Encyclopedia of Classic Takedowns" – 3:59
 "There's Money In New Wave" – 3:18
 "Strings" – 4:37
 "Hostages" – 4:09
 "Wasted English" – 3:23
 "The Troubadour" – 3:49
 "They Should Have Shut Down The Streets" – 3:51
 "Jacksboro" – 3:34 (bonus track on iTunes Store version of the album)

Personnel

Guest musicians include Neko Case.

References

External links
 A.C. Newman's website

2012 albums
A. C. Newman albums
Matador Records albums